The 2019–20 season was the Central Coast Mariners's 15th season since its establishment in 2004.

During the pre-season, Alen Stajcic signed a 3-year contract as the new coach.

On 24 March 2020, the FFA announced that the 2019–20 A-League season would be postponed until further notice due to the COVID-19 pandemic in Australia and New Zealand, and subsequently extended indefinitely. The season resumed on 17 July 2020.

Players

Squad information

Transfers

Transfers in

From academy squad

Transfers out

Contracts extensions

Technical staff

Squad statistics

Appearances and goals

{| class="wikitable sortable plainrowheaders" style="text-align:center"
|-
! rowspan="2" |
! rowspan="2" |
! rowspan="2" style="width:180px;" |Player
! colspan="2" style="width:87px;" |A-League
! colspan="2" style="width:87px;" |FFA Cup
! colspan="2" style="width:87px;" |Total
|-
!
!Goals
!
!Goals
!
!Goals
|-
|1
|GK
! scope="row" | Mark Birighitti

|26
|0

|3
|0

!29
!0
|-
|2
|DF
! scope="row" | Ziggy Gordon

|26
|0

|4
|0

!30
!0
|-
|3
|DF
! scope="row" | Jack Clisby

|21+1
|0

|4
|1

!26
!1
|-
|4
|MF
! scope="row" | Kim Eun-sun

|16+4
|0

|1
|0

!21
!0
|-
|7
|MF
! scope="row" | Milan Đurić

|18+5
|5

|3
|0

!26
!5
|-
|8
|MF
! scope="row" | Michael McGlinchey

|3+5
|0

|1
|2

!9
!2
|-
|9
|FW
! scope="row" | Jordan Murray

|13+5
|4

|2+2
|0

!22
!4
|-
|10
|FW
! scope="row" | Tommy Oar

|18+2
|0

|4
|0

!24
!0
|-
|11
|MF
! scope="row" | Daniel De Silva

|19+1
|1

|4
|0

!24
!1
|-
|12
|GK
! scope="row" | Adam Pearce

|0
|0

|1
|0

!1
!0
|-
|15
|DF
! scope="row" | Kye Rowles

|20
|1

|2
|0

!22
!1
|-
|16
|DF
! scope="row" | Dylan Fox

|10+1
|1

|3
|0

!14
!1
|-
|17
|MF
! scope="row" | Samuel Silvera

|11+10
|1

|3+1
|1

!25
!2
|-
|18
|MF
! scope="row" | Gianni Stensness

|25
|1

|1+1
|0

!27
!1
|-
|19
|FW
! scope="row" | Matt Simon

|4+17
|3

|4
|1

!25
!4
|-
|21
|DF
! scope="row" | Ruon Tongyik

|6+3
|1

|1
|0

!10
!1
|-
|22
|MF
! scope="row" | Jacob Melling

|2
|0

|1+1
|0

!4
!0
|-
|24
|GK
! scope="row" | Chris Harold

|6+1
|2

|0
|0

!7
!2
|-
|25
|FW
! scope="row" | John Roberts†

|0
|0

|0
|0

!0
!0
|-
|26
|MF
! scope="row" | Josh Nisbet†

|9+3
|0

|0+1
|0

!13
!0
|-
|27
|DF
! scope="row" | Lewis Miller†

|15+2
|0

|1
|0

!18
!0
|-
|29
|FW
! scope="row" | Jair

|7+7
|1

|0
|0

!14
!1
|-
|30
|FW
! scope="row" | Dylan Ruiz-Diaz

|1+5
|2

|0
|0

!6
!2
|-
|33
|MF
! scope="row" | Louis Khoury
|0+1
|0
|0
|0
!1
!0
|-
|44
|FW
! scope="row" | Alou Kuol

|1+3
|0

|0
|0

!4
!0
|-
!colspan="25"|Players no longer at the club
|-
|6
|DF
! scope="row" | Giancarlo Gallifuoco

|9+1
|1

|1
|0

!11
!1
|-
|14
|FW
! scope="row" | Abraham Majok

|0+1
|0

|0+2
|1

!3
!1
|-
|18
|MF
! scope="row" | Mark Moric†

|0
|0

|0+1
|0

!1
!0
|-
|23
|MF
! scope="row" | Mario Shabow

|0
|0

|0
|0

!0
!0
|} 

† = Scholarship or youth listed player.

Disciplinary record

Clean sheets

Pre-season

Friendlies

Competitions

Overview

{|class="wikitable" style="text-align:left"
|-
!rowspan=2 style="width:140px;"|Competition
!colspan=8|Record
|-
!style="width:40px;"|
!style="width:40px;"|
!style="width:40px;"|
!style="width:40px;"|
!style="width:40px;"|
!style="width:40px;"|
!style="width:40px;"|
!style="width:70px;"|
|-
|A-League

|-
|FFA Cup

|-
!Total

FFA Cup

A-League

League table

Results summary

Result by round

Matches

References

2019–20 A-League season by team
Central Coast Mariners FC seasons